The 1929–30 Scottish Cup was the 52nd staging of Scotland's most prestigious football knockout competition. The Cup was won by Rangers who defeated Partick Thistle in the replayed final.

Fourth round

Semi-finals

Final

Replay

Teams

See also
1921 Scottish Cup Final (between same teams)
1929–30 in Scottish football

References

Scottish Cup seasons
Scot
Cup